Phantom Punch is the fourth album by Norwegian singer-songwriter and guitarist Sondre Lerche.  The album was released in the U.S. on February 6, 2007, and in Norway, Italy and Canada on February 19 that year.

The first single, "Phantom Punch", was released in August 2006.  Norwegian Radio P3 held a contest to decide who would direct the video.  Kristoffer Borgli won the contest, and the video he directed was released October 25, 2006. The next single to be released was "Say It All" (November 2006); the video for the single was also released in November.  The third single is "The Tape" and was released in the UK in April.

Track listing
All songs written by Sondre Lerche.

The song "John, Let Me Go" is an alternate recording of the same song released on the Two Way Monologue EP (not to be confused with the full-length album of the same name), but the song was then titled "Johnny Johnny, Ooh Ooh".

References

External links
Sondre Lerche's official site—release updates and release information for additional countries

2007 albums
Sondre Lerche albums
Astralwerks albums
Albums produced by Tony Hoffer